Ireland's Classic Hits Radio is an Irish independent multi-region radio station based in Dublin, and broadcasting to that city as well as Cork, Limerick, Galway, County Clare, County Wicklow, County Kildare, County Meath. It can also be picked up in parts of County Kerry, County Tipperary, County Waterford, County Wexford and County Mayo.

The station broadcasts under a sound broadcasting contract from the Broadcasting Authority of Ireland, aimed at Ireland's four main commuter belts, hence its original name of "4FM". It later went by "Classic Hits 4FM", dropping the "4FM" part in 2018 and becoming Ireland's Classic Hits Radio in 2021.

The station is part of Bay Broadcasting Limited, which also has interests in Radio Nova and Sunshine 106.8.

Programming
Ireland's Classic Hits has a mainly adult contemporary/classic hits focused driven format with music from the 1970s, 1980s, 1990s, and 2000s, with small amounts of classic country and hot adult contemporary titles.

The station's flagship breakfast show, The Colm & Lucy Breakfast Show, is presented by Colm Hayes and Lucy Kennedy with other presenters including Trina Mara, Niall Boylan, Damien Farrelly, Gareth O'Callaghan, Ruth Scott, Adrian Kennedy, Barry Lang, Enda Murphy, Lisa Gernon and Meghann Scully. Niall Boylan hosts two daily phone-in shows from 12:00-14:00 and 21:00-23:00. The show won the best talk show award at the New York Festivals International Radio Program Awards Gala in June 2017.

A four-hour drivetime show is hosted by former 2FM presenter Damian Farrelly.

The station has a commitment to regularly playing Irish music, which it promotes under the slogan Guaranteed Irish. A specialist Irish-language programme is hosted on Sunday nights by Meghann Scully.

Additional specialist programming includes the twice-daily segment Classic Song Investigation, Classic Love Songs and Club Classics

In 2021 the station announced that Kim Wilde would present a custom version of 'The Kim Wilde 80s Show' each weekday evening at 6pm. In addition, the station announced the return of broadcaster Gareth O'Callaghan to its schedule in January 2022. 

Programming is broadcast from its digital studios located at Castleforbes House in Dublin's Docklands area.

Former Presenters
The breakfast show was previously presented by PJ and Damien Farrelly, before that Jim McCabe and originally Gareth O'Callaghan.

Awards

Frequencies

Cork

Limerick/Clare

Galway

Greater Dublin

References

External links
 Official website

Adult contemporary radio stations in Ireland
Radio stations in the Republic of Ireland
Mass media in County Cork
Mass media in County Galway
Mass media in County Clare
Mass media in County Limerick
Mass media in Dublin (city)
Radio stations established in 2009
2009 establishments in Ireland